Alexandru Cantacuzino may refer to:

Alexandru Cantacuzino (legionnaire) (1901–1939), a 20th-century Romanian politician and member of the Iron Guard
Alexandru Cantacuzino (minister) (1811–1884), a 19th-century Romanian politician, Minister of Foreign Affairs and Minister of Finance